Günter Nachtigall (born 5 March 1930) is a retired German gymnast. He competed at the 1960 Summer Olympics in all artistic gymnastics events and finished in seventh place with the German team. Individually his best achievement was 33rd place on the vault. During his career he won seven national titles, on the pommel horse (1956), floor (1956, 1957), parallel bars (1956), rings (1956), vault (1957) and allround (1956).

References

1930 births
Living people
German male artistic gymnasts
Gymnasts at the 1960 Summer Olympics
Olympic gymnasts of the United Team of Germany
People from Blankenburg (Harz)
Sportspeople from Saxony-Anhalt